Tom Pelly (1 June 1936 – 23 June 2006) was an Australian rules footballer who played with North Melbourne in the Victorian Football League (VFL) during the 1950s.

Pelly was a Grogan Medal winner while with Western Districts in 1956 and before that had played for Brunswick YCW. His performance at Western Districts earned him a chance in the VFL and he left the Queensland club at the end of the year to join North Melbourne. A rover, he played eight senior games in but only two in 1958. He finished the 1958 season at Williamstown, having been cleared by North Melbourne in July, and was a member of their VFA premiership team that year and again in 1959.

References

1936 births
North Melbourne Football Club players
Western Magpies Australian Football Club players
Williamstown Football Club players
Australian rules footballers from Victoria (Australia)
2006 deaths